The GCC Champions League, is an annually organized football league tournament for club of the Arabian peninsula.

The 2015 edition was the 30th edition and will start in February and finished with the final on 27 May.

Teams

Group stage
Group stage is played as a double round-robin, thus each team plays four matches. After that the top two teams advance to the quarter-finals.

Group A

Group B

Group C

Group D

Knockout-stage

Quarter-finals

Semi-finals

First leg

Second leg

Final

References

External links
Official website
Season at soccerway.com

2015
2015 in Asian football